Yao Chia-wen (born 15 June 1938) is a Taiwanese politician. He was the second chairperson of the Democratic Progressive Party (DPP), serving from 1987 to 1988. He was a member of the Legislative Yuan from 1993 to 1996, and president of the Examination Yuan between 2002 and 2008.

Early life 
Born in Wabi Town, Shōka District, Taichū Prefecture, Japanese Taiwan (modern-day Hemei, Changhua, Taiwan), Yao has eleven younger siblings. In 1957, he started working as a clerk in the Bureau of Telecommunications, which is now the Chunghwa Telecom. Yao studied law at the National Taiwan University in Taipei. He passed the bar exam in 1966 and got his master's degree in law two years later.

Yao co-founded the "Legal Advice Center for Citizens" in 1972 after attending the University of California at Berkeley as a visiting scholar. Four years later, Yao represented Yu Teng-fa.

Yao is married to Chou Ching-yu, who is a former magistrate of Changhua County.

Political career 
Yao called for the abolition of the National Assembly in his book Maintaining and Amending the Law published in 1978. In 1979, Yao was arrested and sentenced to a 12-year prison for his involvement in the Kaohsiung Incident. He served in prison for seven years and became the chairperson of the Democratic Progressive Party after he was released. Under his chairmanship, the party adopted the "Program for the Sovereign Independence of Taiwan". In 1992, Yao joined the Welfare State Alliance faction of the DPP founded by Frank Hsieh. He was elected a member of the Legislative Yuan the same year, but was not re-elected in 1995.

In 1997, Yao started teaching at National Tsing Hua University as an associate professor. He worked as a lawyer again in 1999, as he ran unsuccessfully for legislator again in 1998. President Chen Shui-bian appointed Yao as one of his Senior Advisors in 2000. Two years later, he was appointed as the President of the Examination Yuan. After a contentious but successful confirmation, media coverage focused heavily on alleged extramarital affairs.

Yao was replaced by the Ma Ying-jeou government in 2008 after Chen Shui-bian's administration left office. Yao was named a senior adviser to Tsai Ing-wen in October 2016.

Political ideology 
Yao supports the Taiwan independence movement. He was an editor of the Formosa Magazine, which is associated with the Tangwai movement. In 2006, he wrote a book that examines treaties that have strongly influenced the Taiwanese history with a goal to "set the facts straight" as the history of Taiwan is controversial.

References

External links 

 10th term President – Examination Yuan

1938 births
Democratic Progressive Party chairpersons
National Taiwan University alumni
Senior Advisors to President Chen Shui-bian
Taiwan independence activists
Taiwanese people of Hoklo descent
Living people
Changhua County Members of the Legislative Yuan
20th-century Taiwanese lawyers
Taiwanese Presidents of the Examination Yuan
Democratic Progressive Party Members of the Legislative Yuan
Members of the 2nd Legislative Yuan
Senior Advisors to President Tsai Ing-wen